"No Say in It" is a song recorded by the Australian synthpop band Machinations. It was released in August 1984 as the lead single from the band's second studio album, Big Music. The song peaked at number 14 on the Australian Kent Music Report, becoming the band's first top 20 single. The song appeared in the film Ruthless People and was included on the soundtrack.

At the 1984 Countdown Music Awards, the song was nominated for Best Australian Single.

Reception
Cash Box magazine said "A power packed dance track from Australia's Machinations just right for progressive CHR and modern-leaning AOR."

Track listing
 7" Single (K 9489)
 Side A "No Say in It" - 3:23
 Side B "Man Over Board" - 4:46

 12" Single (X 13169)
 Side A1 "No Say in It"  (Machinations Cut Mix)  - 8:26
 Side B1 "No Say in It"  (Mendelsohn's Played Mix)  - 7:11

Charts

Weekly charts

Year-end charts

References 

1984 songs
Machinations (band) songs
1984 singles